47th Street station is a station on the Orange Line of the San Diego Trolley located in the Chollas View neighborhood San Diego, California. The station primarily serves this mixed-income residential area and includes a park and ride lot.

History
47th Street opened as part of the Euclid Line, the second original line of the San Diego Trolley system, on March 23, 1986.

This station was renovated from October 17, 2011 through fall 2012 as part of the Trolley Renewal Project, although the station remained open during construction.

Station layout
There are two tracks, each served by a side platform.

See also
 List of San Diego Trolley stations

References

Orange Line (San Diego Trolley)
San Diego Trolley stations in San Diego
Railway stations in the United States opened in 1986
1986 establishments in California